Mary Margaret Gore Spicer (1908–1984) was a New Zealand artist.

Education 
Spicer was educated at Chilton Saint James School in Lower Hutt, New Zealand, and Diocesan School for Girls in Auckland. She then trained at the Elam School of Fine Arts and was influenced by the teaching of John Weeks, though she was not taught by him directly.

Career 
Spicer worked in watercolours, often painting landscapes and life in small towns of New Zealand. She was a contemporary of Rena Manson, Ida Eise, and Bessie Christie.

After her studies, Spicer traveled to England and Egypt with her mother, Ella Spicer, also an artist. During their travels they both exhibited in Cairo.

Spicer exhibited with several New Zealand art associations including:
 Auckland Society of Arts
 Canterbury Society of Arts
 New Zealand Academy of Fine Arts
 Rutland Group
 Auckland Fellowship of Artists
In 1963 she was awarded the Kelliher Art Prize (second place).

Her work is held at the Waihi Arts Centre and Museum Association.

References

Further reading 
Artist files for Peggy Spicer are held at:
 Angela Morton Collection, Takapuna Library
 E. H. McCormick Research Library, Auckland Art Gallery Toi o Tāmaki
 Te Aka Matua Research Library, Museum of New Zealand Te Papa Tongarewa
Also see:
 Concise Dictionary of New Zealand Artists McGahey, Kate (2000) Gilt Edge

1908 births
1984 deaths
New Zealand painters
People educated at Diocesan School for Girls, Auckland
People associated with the Canterbury Society of Arts
People associated with the Rutland Group
University of Auckland alumni
Elam Art School alumni
New Zealand women painters
People associated with the Auckland Society of Arts
People educated at Chilton Saint James School